Charles Roger Bailey (born October 3, 1970) is an American former Major League Baseball right-handed pitcher who played for the Colorado Rockies from 1995 to 1997.

A native of Chattahoochee, Florida, Bailey attended Chattahoochee High School, and is an alumnus of Florida State University. In 1991, he played collegiate summer baseball with the Brewster Whitecaps of the Cape Cod Baseball League.

He was selected by the Rockies in the 3rd round of the 1992 MLB Draft. He made his Major League Baseball debut with Colorado on April 27, 1995, and appeared in his final game on September 24, 1997.

References

External links

1970 births
Living people
Baseball players from Florida
Major League Baseball pitchers
Colorado Rockies players
Florida State Seminoles baseball players
Brewster Whitecaps players
People from Gadsden County, Florida
Asheville Tourists players
Bend Rockies players
Carolina Mudcats players
Central Valley Rockies players
Colorado Springs Sky Sox players
Durham Bulls players
New Haven Ravens players
Salem Avalanche players